Aphelia aglossana is a species of moth of the family Tortricidae. It is found in Kazakhstan, Mongolia and Russia.

References

Moths described in 1899
Aphelia (moth)
Moths of Asia